This is a list of performances by actress Jayne Mansfield, including films, television, theater, music, and documentaries.

Filmography

Television work

Fiction

Shows

 Person to Person
 Talk It Up 
 The Match Game

Discography

Albums

Singles

Stage work

Bibliography
 Jayne Mansfield's Wild, Wild World (Holloway House; 1963; co-author: Mickey Hargitay)

References

External links
 
 

Actress filmographies
Jayne Mansfield
American filmographies